Vincent (sometimes referred to as East Irwindale) is a census-designated place (CDP) in the central San Gabriel Valley, in Los Angeles County, California, United States. The city name and zipcode for addresses south of Arrow Highway is Covina and 91722, respectively, and Azusa and 91702 for addresses north of Arrow Highway. The population was 15,922 at the 2010 census, up from 15,097 at the 2000 census. Vincent is named after Vincent Avenue, which passes through the community.

Geography
Vincent is located at  (34.098555, -117.924395).

Demographics

2010
At the 2010 census Vincent had a population of 15,922. The racial makeup of Vincent was 8,670 (54.5%) White (15.0% Non-Hispanic White), 312 (2.0%) African American, 146 (0.9%) Native American, 1,128 (7.1%) Asian, 31 (0.2%) Pacific Islander, 4,857 (30.5%) from other races, and 778 (4.9%) from two or more races. Hispanic or Latino of any race were 11,921 persons (74.9%).

The census reported that 15,899 people (99.9% of the population) lived in households, 18 (0.1%) lived in non-institutionalized group quarters, and 5 (0%) were institutionalized.

There were 3,900 households, 2,063 (52.9%) had children under the age of 18 living in them, 2,367 (60.7%) were opposite-sex married couples living together, 661 (16.9%) had a female householder with no husband present, 361 (9.3%) had a male householder with no wife present.  There were 217 (5.6%) unmarried opposite-sex partnerships, and 22 (0.6%) same-sex couples or partnerships. 364 households (9.3%) were one person and 149 (3.8%) had someone living alone who was 65 or older. The average household size was 4.08.  There were 3,389 families (86.9% of households); the average family size was 4.21.

The age distribution was 4,536 people (28.5%) under the age of 18, 1,823 people (11.4%) aged 18 to 24, 4,488 people (28.2%) aged 25 to 44, 3,656 people (23.0%) aged 45 to 64, and 1,419 people (8.9%) who were 65 or older.  The median age was 32.4 years. For every 100 females, there were 98.9 males.  For every 100 females age 18 and over, there were 97.9 males.

There were 4,016 housing units at an average density of 2,731.0 per square mile, of the occupied units 3,085 (79.1%) were owner-occupied and 815 (20.9%) were rented. The homeowner vacancy rate was 1.1%; the rental vacancy rate was 4.9%.  12,261 people (77.0% of the population) lived in owner-occupied housing units and 3,638 people (22.8%) lived in rental housing units.

2000
In the census of 2000, there were 15,097 people, 3,804 households, and 3,267 families living in the CDP. The population density was 10,039.3 inhabitants per square mile (3,886.0/km). The racial makeup of the CDP was 51.74% White, 2.67% African American, 1.27% Native American, 6.86% Asian, 0.08% Pacific Islander, 31.80% from other races, and 5.58% from two or more races. Hispanic or Latino of any race were 64.41% of the population.

Of the 3,804 households 49.1% had children under the age of 18 living with them, 63.4% were married couples living together, 14.7% had a female householder with no husband present, and 14.1% were non-families. 10.3% of households were one person and 4.8% were one person aged 65 or older.  The average household size was 3.97 and the average family size was 4.17.

The age distribution was 33.3% under the age of 18, 10.5% from 18 to 24, 31.1% from 25 to 44, 17.9% from 45 to 64, and 7.2% 65 or older.  The median age was 30 years. For every 100 females, there were 97.7 males.  For every 100 females age 18 and over, there were 97.0 males.

The median household income was $52,349 and the median family income  was $52,086. Males had a median income of $34,075 versus $28,895 for females. The per capita income for the CDP was $15,522.  About 7.3% of families and 9.8% of the population were below the poverty line, including 13.2% of those under age 18 and 6.5% of those age 65 or over.

Politics
In the state legislature Vincent is located in the 24th Senate District, represented by Democrat Gloria Romero, and in the 57th Assembly District, represented by Democrat Edward P. Hernandez. Federally, Vincent is located in California's 32nd congressional district, which is represented by Democrat Grace Napolitano.

References

Communities in the San Gabriel Valley
Census-designated places in Los Angeles County, California
Census-designated places in California